Jo Cox (1974–2016) was a British politician.  

Jo Cox may also refer to:
Jo Cox-Ladru (1923–?), Dutch gymnast
Josephine Cox (1938–2020), English author also known as "Jo"
Joanna Cox, British mariner and Harbour Master for the Falkland Islands Maritime Authority

See also
Joseph Cox (disambiguation), includes people named Joe Cox